Athouhon Louise Ayétotché (born 3 June 1975) is a retired Ivorian sprinter who specialized in the 100 meters and the 200 metres. She represented her country at the 1992 and 2000 Summer Olympics, as well as four World Championships.

Achievements

Personal bests
100 metres - 11.35 s (2000)- Former national record. 
200 metres - 22.76 s (2000) - Former national record.
400 metres - 52.92 s (2006)
4 x 100 metres relay - 43.89 s (2001) - national record.

References

External links

1975 births
Living people
Ivorian female sprinters
Athletes (track and field) at the 1992 Summer Olympics
Athletes (track and field) at the 2000 Summer Olympics
Olympic athletes of Ivory Coast
World Athletics Championships athletes for Ivory Coast
African Games bronze medalists for Ivory Coast
African Games medalists in athletics (track and field)
Athletes (track and field) at the 1999 All-Africa Games
Athletes (track and field) at the 2003 All-Africa Games
Athletes (track and field) at the 2007 All-Africa Games
Olympic female sprinters